Carex biltmoreana, known as Biltmore sedge, is a species of sedge that was first described by Kenneth Mackenzie in 1910. It is endemic to the southeastern United States, where it occurs in southwestern North Carolina, northwestern South Carolina, and northeastern Georgia. Biltmore sedge grows on rock outcrops, often on granite, and in adjacent woodlands.

References

biltmoreana
Flora of the Southeastern United States
Plants described in 1910
Flora without expected TNC conservation status